Cabeiri (Greek) – Smith and wine spirit
 Cacus (Roman) – Fire-breathing giant
 Cadejo (Central America) – Cow-sized dog-goat hybrid 
 Cailleach (Scottish) – Divine creator and weather deity hag
 Caipora (Tupi) – Fox-human hybrid and nature spirit
 Caladrius (Medieval Bestiary) – White bird that can foretell if a sick person will recover or die
 Calingi (Medieval Bestiary) – Humanoid with an eight-year lifespan
 Callitrix (Medieval Bestiary) – Apes who always bear twins, one the mother loves, the other it hates
 Calydonian Boar (Greek) – Giant, chthonic boar
 Calygreyhound (Heraldic) – Wildcat-deer/antelope-eagle-ox-lion hybrid 
 Camahueto (Chilota) – One-horned calf
 Cambion (Medieval folklore) – Offspring of a human and an incubus or succubus 
 Campe (Greek) – Dragon-human-scorpion hybrid
 Camulatz (Mayan) – Bird that ate the heads of the first men
 Candileja (Colombian) – Spectral, fiery hag
 Canaima (Guyanese) – Were-jaguar
 Canotila (Lakota) – Little people and tree spirits
 Caoineag (Scottish) – Death spirit (a particular type of Banshee/Bean Sídhe)
 Čhápa (Lakota) – Beaver spirit
 Chareng (Meitei mythology) — Semi-hornbill, semi-human creature
 Căpcăun (Romanian) – Large, monstrous humanoid
 Carbuncle (Latin America) – Small creature with a jewel on its head
 Catoblepas (Medieval Bestiary) – Scaled buffalo-hog hybrid
 Cat Sidhe (Scottish) – Fairy cat
 Ceasg (Scottish) – Benevolent Scottish mermaids
 Ceffyl Dŵr (Welsh) – Malevolent water horse
 Centaur (Greek) – Human-horse hybrid
 Centicore (Indian) – Horse-Antelope-Lion-Bear hybrid
 Cerastes (Greek) – Extremely flexible, horned snake
 Cerberus (Greek) – Three-headed dog that guards the entrance to the underworld
 Cercopes (Greek) – Mischievous forest spirit
 Cericopithicus (Medieval Bestiary) – Apes who always bear twins, one the mother loves, the other it hates
 Ceryneian Hind (Greek) – Hind with golden antlers and bronze or brass hooves
 Cetus
 Chakora (Hindu) – Lunar bird
 Chalkydri (Apocryphal writings) – Angelic birds
 Chamrosh (Persian) – Dog-bird hybrid
 Chaneque (Aztec) – Little people and nature spirits
 Changeling (European) – Humanoid child (fairy, elf, troll, etc.) substituted for a kidnapped human child
 Charybdis (Greek) – Sea monster in the form of a giant mouth
 Chenoo (Mi'kmaq/Algonquian) – Giant, human-eating ice monsters; former humans who either committed terrible crime(s) or were possessed by evil spirits, turning their hearts to ice
 Chepi (Narragansett) – Ancestral spirit that instructs tribe members
 Cherufe (Mapuche) – Volcano-dwelling monster
 Cheval Mallet (French) – Evil horse who runs away with travelers
 Cheval Gauvin (French) – Evil horse who drowns riders, similar to kelpie
 Church grim (Germanic) – Guardian spirit
 Chibaiskweda (Abenaki) – Ghost of an improperly buried person
 Chichevache – Human-faced cow that feeds on good women
 Chickcharney (Bahamian) – Bird-mammal hybrid
 Chimaera (Greek) – Lion-goat-snake hybrid
 Chindi (Navajo) – Vengeful ghost that causes dust devils
 Chinthe (Burmese) – Temple-guarding feline, similar to Chinese Shi and Japanese Shisa
 Chitauli (Zulu) – Human-lizard hybrid
 Chōchinobake (Japanese) – Animated paper lantern
 Chol (Biblical mythology) – Regenerative bird
 Chollima (Korean) – Supernaturally fast horse
 Chonchon (Mapuche) – Disembodied, flying head
 Choorile (Guyanese) – Ghost of a woman that died in childbirth
 Chromandi (Medieval Bestiary) – Hairy savage with dog teeth
 Chrysaor (Greek) – Giant son of the gorgon Medusa
 Chrysomallus (Greek mythology) – Golden winged ram
 Chukwa (Hindu) – Giant turtle that supports the world
 Chupacabra (Latin America) – Cryptid beast named for its habit of sucking the blood of livestock
 Churel (Hindu) – Vampiric, female ghost
 Ciguapa (Dominican Republic) – Malevolent seductress
 Cihuateteo (Aztec) – Ghost of women that died in childbirth
 Cikavac (Serbian) – Bird that serves its owner
 Cinnamon bird (Medieval Bestiaries) – Giant bird that makes its nest out of cinnamon
 Cipactli (Aztec) – Sea monster, crocodile-fish hybrid
 Cirein cròin (Scottish) – Sea serpent
 Coblynau (Welsh) – Little people and mine spirits
 Cockatrice (Medieval Bestiaries) – Chicken-lizard hybrid
 Cofgod (English) – Cove god
 Colo Colo (Mapuche) – Rat-bird hybrid that can shapeshift into a serpent
 Corycian nymphs (Greek) – Nymph of the Corycian Cave
 Cretan Bull (Greek) – Monstrous bull
 Crinaeae (Greek) – Fountain nymph
 Criosphinx (Ancient Egypt) – Ram-headed sphinx
 Crocotta (Medieval Bestiaries) – Monstrous dog-wolf
 The Cu Bird (Mexican) – El Pájaro Cu; a bird
 Cuco (Latin America) – Bogeyman
 Cucuy (Latin America) – Malevolent spirit
 Cuegle (Cantabrian) – Monstrous, three-armed humanoid
 Cuélebre (Asturian and Cantabrian) – Dragon
 Curupira (Tupi) – Nature spirit
 Cu Sith (Scottish) – Gigantic fairy dog
 Cŵn Annwn (Welsh) – Underworld hunting dog
 Cyclops (Greek) – One-eyed giant
 Cyhyraeth (Welsh) – Death spirit
 Cynocephalus (Medieval Bestiaries) – Dog-headed humanoid

C